"Let's Get Rocked" is a 1992 single by English hard rock band Def Leppard from their multi-platinum album Adrenalize. The song peaked at number one on the Billboard Album Rock Tracks chart, number 15 on the Billboard Hot 100, number two on the UK Singles Chart, and number three on the Canadian RPM Top Singles chart.

Background and release

The lyrics are about a teenager disobeying the orders of his parents.

According to a Joe Elliott statement on the Rock of Ages and Best Of compilation albums, this song was an escapism since the band was working on the "White Lightning" song and felt like doing something to lighten the atmosphere. This song and "White Lightning" were the last two songs recorded for the album.

The song has been a live fixture on all of the band's tours since its release.

Music video
The song was accompanied by a then state-of-the-art computer animated music video directed by Steve Barron. The video consists of the band playing in a computer generated stadium on top of an LED lit stage in the shape of the flag of the United Kingdom, along with CGI animated scenes featuring a character named Flynn. Flynn is seen in various moments of a typical day of a teenager's life, which include being berated by his father to do chores, or sexual activity from his girlfriend.

This video is not only the band's first without Steve Clark, who died the previous year, but their only video as a four-piece. Guitarist Vivian Campbell had not yet been selected to replace Clark. As such, initial live performances of the song were as a four-piece before Campbell joined the band.

Track listings
12" maxi (Bludgeon Riffola) / DEFXP 7 - UK / INT 866 587-1 / Picture Disc

This 12" single picture disc has a blue eye graphic in the cover. On the back side of the picture disc has the band's picture. The back cardboard has the 12" single information and the same band picture. Pictures by Pamela Springsteen. Artwork and Design by Andie Airfix at Satori.

 "Let's Get Rocked"
 "Only After Dark"
 "Too Late for Love" (live)

Track 3 was recorded at McNichols Arena, Denver, Colorado on 12 & 13 February 1988

CD maxi (Bludgeon Riffola) / DEFCD 7 - UK / 866-591-2 - INT
 "Let's Get Rocked"
 "Only After Dark"
 "Women" (live)

Track 3 was recorded at McNichols Arena, Denver, Colorado on 12 & 13 February 1988

7" single: Bludgeon Riffola / DEF 7 (UK)
 "Let's Get Rocked" – 4:56
 "Only After Dark" – 4:02

Cassette single: Bludgeon Riffola / 866 586-4 / DEFMC 7 (UK)
 "Let's Get Rocked"
 "Only After Dark"

Charts and certifications

Weekly charts

Year-end charts

Certifications

In popular culture
The song was used in the 1992 film Encino Man (but does not appear on the soundtrack) and the 2001 film Rock Star. It was used to promote the NBC comedy series 30 Rock.

References

1992 singles
1992 songs
Def Leppard songs
Mercury Records singles
Music videos directed by Steve Barron
Songs written by Joe Elliott
Songs written by Phil Collen
Songs written by Rick Savage
Songs written by Robert John "Mutt" Lange